Michael S. Roufogalis, commonly Michalis Roufogalis (Μιχάλης Ρουφογάλης, 192124 February 2000) was a Greek Army officer and leading member of the Greek military junta of 1967-1974. He was born in Akrata and grew up in Patras.

Originally an officer in the Greek Army's Artillery, under the junta he was appointed chief of the Greek Central Intelligence Service (KYP).

In 1968, he and his agency secretly funded the presidential campaign of Richard Nixon.

After the restoration of democracy in 1974, he was arrested, tried and convicted during the Greek Junta Trials. He died in prison in February 2000.

His wife, Della Roufogalis, was a famous Greek fashion model.

References

1921 births
2000 deaths
Leaders of the Greek junta
Hellenic Army officers
National Intelligence Service (Greece)
Greek prisoners and detainees
People convicted of treason against Greece
Prisoners and detainees of Greece
People from Akrata